The Battle of Tatayibá was a cavalry engagement between a Paraguayan force led by future president Bernardino Caballero and a Brazilian force led by Luís Alves de Lima e Silva, then Marquis of Caxias. The Brazilians, outnumbering the Paraguayans nearly 3 to 2, were victorious.

A trap was set by the Brazilian cavalry in order to stop the daily sorties by Lt. Col. Caballero's Paraguayan cavalry. Hiding their main force in the woods, a few Brazilians lured the Paraguayan cavalry on a three-mile chase. The Paraguayans were surrounded at Tatayibá, with only a few making it back to Humaitá. Caballero was promoted to colonel and a medal ordered for his survivors.

References

Tatayibá
Tatayibá
Tatayiba
Tatayiba
October 1867 events
1867 in Paraguay
History of Ñeembucú Department